Ambepitiya is a surname. Notable people with the surname include:

Sarath Ambepitiya (1946–2004), Sri Lankan judge
Shehan Ambepitiya (born 1990), Sri Lankan sprinter